In mathematics, a quasiconvex function is a real-valued function defined on an interval or on a convex subset of a real vector space such that the inverse image of any set of the form  is a convex set. For a function of a single variable, along any stretch of the curve the highest point is one of the endpoints. The negative of a quasiconvex function is said to be quasiconcave.

All convex functions are also quasiconvex, but not all quasiconvex functions are convex, so quasiconvexity is a generalization of convexity. Univariate unimodal functions are quasiconvex or quasiconcave, however this is not necessarily the case for functions with multiple arguments. For example, the 2-dimensional Rosenbrock function is unimodal but not quasiconvex and functions with star-convex sublevel sets can be unimodal without being quasiconvex.

Definition and properties

A function  defined on a convex subset  of a real vector space is quasiconvex if for all  and  we have

 

In words, if  is such that it is always true that a point directly between two other points does not give a higher value of the function than both of the other points do, then  is quasiconvex.

An alternative way (see introduction) of defining a quasi-convex function  is to require that each sublevel set

is a convex set.

If furthermore

 

That is, strict quasiconvexity requires that a point directly between two other points must give a lower value of the function than one of the other points does.

A quasiconcave function is a function whose negative is quasiconvex, and a strictly quasiconcave function is a function whose negative is strictly quasiconvex. Equivalently a function  is quasiconcave if

 

and strictly quasiconcave if

 

A (strictly) quasiconvex function has (strictly) convex lower contour sets, while a (strictly) quasiconcave function has (strictly) convex upper contour sets.

A function that is both quasiconvex and quasiconcave is quasilinear.

A particular case of quasi-concavity, if , is unimodality, in which there is a locally maximal value.

Applications
Quasiconvex functions have applications in mathematical analysis, in mathematical optimization, and in game theory and economics.

Mathematical optimization
In nonlinear optimization, quasiconvex programming studies iterative methods that converge to a minimum (if one exists) for quasiconvex functions.  Quasiconvex programming is a generalization of  convex programming. Quasiconvex programming is used in the solution of "surrogate" dual problems, whose biduals provide quasiconvex closures of the primal problem, which therefore provide tighter bounds than do the convex closures provided by Lagrangian dual problems. In theory, quasiconvex programming and convex programming problems can be solved in reasonable amount of time, where the number of iterations grows like a polynomial in the dimension of the problem (and in the reciprocal of the approximation error tolerated); however, such theoretically "efficient" methods use "divergent-series" stepsize rules, which were first developed for classical subgradient methods. Classical subgradient methods using divergent-series rules are much slower than modern methods of convex minimization, such as subgradient projection methods, bundle methods of descent, and nonsmooth filter methods.

Economics and partial differential equations: Minimax theorems

In microeconomics, quasiconcave utility functions imply that consumers have convex preferences. Quasiconvex functions are important
also in game theory, industrial organization, and  general equilibrium theory, particularly for applications of Sion's minimax theorem. Generalizing a minimax theorem of John von Neumann, Sion's theorem is also used in the theory of partial differential equations.

Preservation of quasiconvexity

Operations preserving quasiconvexity
 maximum of quasiconvex functions (i.e.  ) is quasiconvex. Similarly, maximum of strict quasiconvex functions is  strict quasiconvex. Similarly, the minimum of quasiconcave functions is quasiconcave, and the minimum of strictly-quasiconcave functions is strictly-quasiconcave.
 composition with a non-decreasing function :  quasiconvex,  non-decreasing, then  is quasiconvex. Similarly, if  quasiconcave,  non-decreasing, then  is quasiconcave.
 minimization (i.e.  quasiconvex,  convex set, then  is quasiconvex)

Operations not preserving quasiconvexity
 The sum of quasiconvex functions defined on the same domain need not be quasiconvex: In other words, if  are quasiconvex, then  need not be quasiconvex. 
 The sum of quasiconvex functions defined on different domains (i.e. if  are quasiconvex) need not be quasiconvex. Such functions are called "additively decomposed" in economics and "separable" in mathematical optimization.

Examples
 Every convex function is quasiconvex.
 A concave function can be quasiconvex. For example,  is both concave and quasiconvex.
 Any monotonic function is both quasiconvex and quasiconcave. More generally, a function which decreases up to a point and increases from that point on is quasiconvex (compare unimodality).
The floor function   is an example of a quasiconvex function that is neither convex nor continuous.

See also
 Convex function
 Concave function
 Logarithmically concave function
 Pseudoconvexity in the sense of several complex variables (not generalized convexity)
 Pseudoconvex function
 Invex function
 Concavification

References

 Avriel, M., Diewert, W.E., Schaible, S. and Zang, I., Generalized Concavity, Plenum Press, 1988.
 
 Singer, Ivan Abstract convex analysis. Canadian Mathematical Society Series of Monographs and Advanced Texts. A Wiley-Interscience Publication. John Wiley & Sons, Inc., New York, 1997. xxii+491 pp.

External links
 SION, M., "On general minimax theorems", Pacific J. Math. 8 (1958), 171-176.
 Mathematical programming glossary
 Concave and Quasi-Concave Functions - by Charles Wilson, NYU Department of Economics
 Quasiconcavity and quasiconvexity - by Martin J. Osborne, University of Toronto Department of Economics

Convex analysis
Convex optimization
Generalized convexity
Real analysis
Types of functions